Local elections was held in San Juan, Metro Manila on May 13, 2019 within the Philippine general election. The voters elected for the elective local posts in the city: the mayor, vice mayor, the congressman, and the councilors, six of them in the two districts of the city.

Former Vice Mayor Francis Zamora led the mayoral race with 35,000 votes defeating incumbent Vice Mayor Janella Ejercito, granddaughter of former President and incumbent Mayor of Manila Joseph Estrada, who garnered 24,813 votes. Zamora's victory marked the conclusion of the reign of the Ejercito Estradas in the city who ruled the city for 50 years.

Background
Incumbent Guia Gomez is now on her third and final term as mayor of San Juan. She was elected as mayor in 2010 replacing her son, JV Ejercito, who served as mayor from 2001 to 2010 before being elected as representative of the Lone District of San Juan and later Senator of the Philippines. Incumbent vice mayor Janella Ejercito is her party's nominee for the mayorship. She is the granddaughter of former president and incumbent Manila mayor Joseph Estrada and the eldest daughter of former senator Jinggoy Estrada; both are former mayors of San Juan and former senators as well. Her running mate is incumbent councilor Leonardo Celles, who served as vice mayor of San Juan from 2001 to 2010. Her main opponent is Francis Zamora, former vice mayor of San Juan and Gomez's opponent in 2016. The Ejercitos and Zamoras used to be allies before becoming rivals.

Candidates

Mayor

Vice mayor

District representative
Incumbent Ronaldo Zamora is running for re-election again. Challenging him is actor and former Makati Vice Mayor Edu Manzano.

Councilors

One San Juan

Team San Juan

Katipunan ng Demokratikong Pilipino

District 1

|-bgcolor=black
|colspan=7|

District 2

|-bgcolor=black
|colspan=6|

References

2019 Philippine local elections
Elections in San Juan, Metro Manila
May 2019 events in the Philippines
2019 elections in Metro Manila